The following list of Carnegie libraries in Washington, D.C. provides detailed information on United States Carnegie libraries in Washington, D.C., where 4 public libraries were built from one grant (totaling $682,000) awarded by the Carnegie Corporation of New York on March 16, 1899. In addition, one academic library was granted.

Key

Carnegie libraries

Academic library

Notes

References

Note: The above references, while all authoritative, are not entirely mutually consistent. Some details of this list may have been drawn from one of the references without support from the others.  Reader discretion is advised.

Libraries
Washington DC
 
Libraries